The Best Man: The Final Chapters  is an American comedy-drama miniseries created by Malcolm D. Lee and developed by Lee and Dayna Lynne North. The series takes place a few years after The Best Man Holiday and it premiered on Peacock on December 22, 2022.

Cast and characters

Main

 Morris Chestnut as Lance Sullivan
 Melissa De Sousa as Shelby Taylor
 Taye Diggs as Harper Stewart
 Regina Hall as Candace "Candy" Sparks
 Terrence Howard as Quentin Spivey
 Sanaa Lathan as Robyn Stewart, Harper's wife
 Nia Long as Jordan Armstrong
 Harold Perrineau as Julian "Murch" Murchison, Candace's husband

Recurring

 Ron Canada as Wellington, Quentin's father
 Yvonna Pearson as Jasmine, a concierge at the resort in San Pierre that shares a connection with Lance
 Aaron Serotsky as Stan, Harper's literary agent
 Brandon Victor Dixon as Demetrius
 Eric Scott Ways as LJ, Lance and Mia's oldest child who is nonbinary

Special guest star
 Nicole Ari Parker as Xiomara Amani

Notable guest stars
 Terrence Terrell as Will
 Monica Calhoun as Mia Sullivan, Lance's deceased wife
 Michael Genet as Dr. Temple
 Tobias Truvillion as Jaha

Episodes

Production

Development
On February 9, 2021, Peacock gave production a limited series order consisting of ten episodes. It is created by Malcolm D. Lee and Dayna Lynne North who are also executive producing it. Filming for the limited series began on March 14, 2022. It was filmed in New York City, New Jersey, and Dominican Republic. The series is set to be released on Peacock on December 22, 2022, with all eight episodes instead of the original ten-episode order. The limited series picks up a few years after The Best Man Holiday.

Casting
Upon the limited series order announcement, Morris Chestnut, Melissa De Sousa, Taye Diggs, Regina Hall, Terrence Howard, Sanaa Lathan, Nia Long, and Harold Perrineau are set to reprise their roles from 1999's film The Best Man. On April 29, 2022, Nicole Ari Parker, Ron Canada, Brandon Victor Dixon, Michael Genet, Yvonna Pearson, Aaron Serotsky, Terrence Terrell, Tobias Truvillion, and Eric Scott Ways joined the cast in recurring roles.

Reception
The review aggregator website Rotten Tomatoes reported an 88% approval rating with an average rating of 7/10, based on 8 critic reviews. Metacritic, which uses a weighted average, assigned a score of 58 out of 100 based on 4 critics, indicating "mixed or average reviews".

References

External links
 
 

2022 American television series debuts
2022 American television series endings
2020s American comedy-drama television series
American television spin-offs
English-language television shows
Live action television shows based on films
Peacock (streaming service) original programming
Television series by Universal Television